Clypastraea is a genus of minute hooded beetles in the family Corylophidae. There are more than 20 described species in Clypastraea.

Species
These 23 species belong to the genus Clypastraea:

 Clypastraea amabilis (LeConte, 1852)
 Clypastraea angusticolle (Scott, 1908)
 Clypastraea balteata (Matthews, 1899)
 Clypastraea biguttata (LeConte, 1879)
 Clypastraea brunnea (C.Brisout de Barneville, 1863)
 Clypastraea decora (Casey, 1900)
 Clypastraea fasciata (Say, 1827)
 Clypastraea fuscum Harold, 1875
 Clypastraea lepida (LeConte, 1852)
 Clypastraea lugubris (LeConte, 1852)
 Clypastraea lunata (LeConte, 1852)
 Clypastraea montana (Casey, 1900)
 Clypastraea nigra (Casey, 1900)
 Clypastraea obesa (Casey, 1900)
 Clypastraea obscura (LeConte, 1852)
 Clypastraea ornata (Casey, 1900)
 Clypastraea palmi Bowestead, 1999
 Clypastraea parvula (Casey, 1900)
 Clypastraea primainterpares Alekseev, 2016
 Clypastraea pusilla (Gyllenhal, 1810)
 Clypastraea reitteri Bowestead, 1999
 Clypastraea specularis (Casey, 1900)
 Clypastraea sp-one

References

Further reading

External links

 

Corylophidae
Articles created by Qbugbot
Coccinelloidea genera